Kulp (Qulb, central district:  Pasur) is a district of Diyarbakır Province in Turkey. The population was 10,119 in 2010.

History
The Kulp region gained importance as a center for the Kurdish chiefdoms in Kulp itself and nearby Zeyrek (to the west).

In 1993 Kulp was under siege by the Workers Party of Kurdistan (PKK). Inhabitants whom the Turkish Government suspected of siding with the PKK were resettled to Diyarbakir.

Politics 
In the local elections on the 31 March 2019 Mehmet Fatih Taş of the Peoples' Democratic Party (HDP) was elected Mayor. But he was dismissed by the Ministry of the Interior due to an investigation relating to a terrorist attack. Kaymakam Mustafa Gözlet will act as a trustee instead.

Sources

Kurdish settlements in Turkey
Populated places in Diyarbakır Province
Districts of Diyarbakır Province